The place-names of Wales derive in most cases from the Welsh language, but have also been influenced by linguistic contact with the Romans, Anglo-Saxons, Vikings, Anglo-Normans and modern English. Toponymy in Wales reveals significant features of the country's history and geography, as well as the development of the Welsh language. Its study is promoted by the Welsh Place-Name Society.

History

During the 4th to 11th centuries, while Anglo-Saxons and other migrants from Europe settled adjoining areas of Britain, Wales developed as a distinctive entity, developing its language, culture, legal code, and political structures. By stages between the 11th and 16th centuries, Wales was then subdued, conquered and eventually incorporated into the Kingdom of England while still retaining many distinct cultural features, most notably its language. Since then, there has been a mixing of cultures in Wales, with the English language dominant in industry and commerce, but with Welsh remaining as a living language, particularly in its stronghold, y Fro Gymraeg or "Welsh language country" in northwest, mid- and west Wales. Welsh culture and political autonomy has been reasserted increasingly since the mid 19th century.

Language characteristics
 
The Welsh language is a Western Brittonic language descended from the Common Brittonic spoken throughout Britain in the centuries before the Anglo-Saxon and Viking invasions that led to the creation of England. Many place-names in Britain, particularly of natural features such as rivers and hills, derive directly from Common Brittonic. Obvious examples of place-names of Welsh origin include Penrith ("headland by the ford") and the numerous Rivers Avon, from the Welsh afon ("river").

Place-names from the Western Brittonic-speaking Hen Ogledd occur in Cumbria and the Scottish Lowlands. These include the name of Edinburgh, from Cumbric Din Eidin "Eidin's Fort".

The Cornish language is a Southwestern Brittonic language and many place-names in Cornwall and to a lesser extent neighbouring Devon, Somerset and Dorset therefore have similar origins to names in Wales, such as the River Avon, Devon. The settlement name Tre- is identical to that used in Welsh and is among the most common placename elements in both Wales and Cornwall equating to English -ton, alongside Lan- equating to Welsh Llan- combined with the name of a Saint. In Devon the prevalent use of -combe reflects an early English borrowing of Cornish/Welsh cwm.

Welsh remains a living language, spoken by over 20% of the country's population. Like all languages, it has changed over time and continues to do so, for instance by accepting loan words from other languages such as Latin and English. The Welsh language itself has many characteristics unfamiliar to most English speakers that can make it difficult to understand its place-names. For example, it uses a number of initial consonant changes (called "mutations") in different grammatical circumstances. In relation to place-names, this means that, for example, a parish (llan) dedicated to one of the saints Mary (Mair) becomes Llanfair – the initial m of Mair changes to f (pronounced /v/) for grammatical reasons. Other changes can apply to internal vowels.

There are also differences between Welsh and English spelling standards, which have affected how place-names are spelled in the two languages. For instance, a single f in Welsh is always pronounced /v/ (or is silent), while ff is pronounced /f/; thus, the Welsh word for river, afon, is pronounced with a v-sound and so often spelled "Avon" when it appears in English place-names and river names.

Development of place-names in Wales

Early inhabitants of Wales gave names first to noteworthy natural features, such as rivers, hills, mountains, harbours and shores. Before the Roman occupation in the first century, there does not seem to have been a coming together in organised settlements, and therefore little reason to give names to such places.  The Roman towns which were established were generally fortified and were given the generic name of castra, which in Welsh became caer, originally with the meaning of "fortified enclosure".  Many of these continued as towns after the Romans left, including Caernarfon, Carmarthen (Caerfyrddin), Caerleon, and Caerwent.

Elsewhere, many villages and later towns took their names from natural features.  For example, Abergele refers to the "mouth of the [river] Gele", Harlech means "fair rock", Rhuddlan  "red bank", and Porthcawl "harbour with sea-kale".  Aberystwyth means "mouth of the Ystwyth", a river a mile or so away from the town centre, and was apparently so named as a result of confusion by the English over the different castles in the area.

Many others took their name from religious settlements and clasau (monasteries) established from the fifth century onwards. These generally use the prefix llan, roughly equivalent to "parish". Most of them are dedicated to their founders, who hailed from local dynasties and were venerated as patron saints. Examples include Llandudno ("Saint Tudno's"), Llanelli ("Saint Elli's"), and Llantwit ("Illtud's"). Following the Norman invasion of Wales, some were rededicated to more generic saints: Llanilar ("Saint Hilary's"), Llanfoist ("Saint Faith's"). A few—usually by mistake—include other elements or none at all: Llan, Powys, Llanharry, Llangefni ("Parish by the Afon Cefni"). Other religious place-names include merthyr ("martyr") and eglwys ("church").

Over the centuries, Welsh place-names have been variously affected by social and economic changes in the country.  The Industrial Revolution saw the development of many new towns and villages, particularly in south Wales. Some of these used already existing place-names, while others acquired new names.  For example, the towns of Port Talbot and Tredegar took the names of their main landowners and developers.  In north Wales, Porthmadog was originally named "Portmadoc" by its developer William Madocks, to commemorate both his own name and that of the possibly mythical sailor Madoc.  An early example of a publicity stunt saw the village of Llanfairpwllgwyngyll ("St Mary's church beside the hollow with white hazels") renaming itself in the 1860s with an even longer title, in an attempt to keep its railway station open.

Common elements of Welsh place-names thus include both words for topographical features and words reflecting human influence.  Some of the most frequently encountered place-name elements in Wales are shown in the table below. The Welsh version shown is the original, unmutated reference form.

Relationship between Welsh and English place-names
In the majority of cases in Wales, the Welsh and English names for a place are identical, almost always because the Welsh name is used. So, for example, Aberystwyth, Blaenau Ffestiniog, Bangor, Machynlleth and Llandudno all have the same spelling in Welsh and English, although it is also often the case that many English people do not pronounce the name in the same way as the Welsh.

There are also many instances where the Welsh and English names are very similar, both in spelling and pronunciation. Examples are Caerphilly (Caerffili), Raglan (Rhaglan), Treorchy (Treorci), Barry (Y Barri) and Merthyr Tydfil (Merthyr Tudful). In most of these cases, English usage adopted and anglicised the Welsh name, although there are some cases, especially close to the English border, where the English name was adopted by the Welsh. Examples are Flint (Y Fflint) and Wrexham (Wrecsam) in north east Wales, and Caldicot (Cil-y-coed) in south east Wales. A related case is the Norman French foundation of Beaumaris (Biwmares). In a few cases, such as Prestatyn (originally "priest's town", which elsewhere became "Preston") and Mostyn, the original name was wholly English but has gradually taken on a Welsh appearance. In some cases this in fact results from Welsh having preserved an earlier stage of English pronunciation; as is the case in Prestatyn (Old English Preostatun /'pre:əstɑtu:n/) or the mountain Cnicht ("knight"), Old/Middle English pronunciation /knɪɕt/. This also occurs in reverse; eg English Severn preserves the Proto-Celtic [s] which became [h] in modern Welsh (Hafren). In one or two others, such as Caergwrle, the name combines Welsh (caer) and English elements – the village was originally the English settlement of Corley.

In some cases, the spelling formerly used in English has, over the past few decades, ceased to be accepted – examples are Caernarfon (formerly, in English, Ca(e)rnarvon), Conwy (formerly Conway), and Llanelli (formerly Llanelly).  Most of these examples are in predominantly Welsh-speaking areas of Wales. There are also places where there are ongoing disagreements over whether the Welsh spelling should be used exclusively or not, such as Criccieth (Cricieth), Rhayader (Rhaeadr), and Ruthin (Rhuthun).

In other cases, the Welsh and English names clearly share the same original form, but spellings and pronunciation have diverged over the years. One obvious example is Cardiff (Caerdydd). The medieval Welsh form was Caerdyf (with a final ) from which are derived the modern English Cardiff (with a final ) and the modern Welsh Caerdydd (with a final ). Some examples of the anglicisation of place-names are the towns of Denbigh and Tenby, both derived from the Welsh name Dinbych ("little fort"); Pembroke (from Penfro, literally "land's end"); Lampeter (from Llanbedr, in full Llanbedr Pont Steffan); Skenfrith (from Ynysgynwraidd); and Barmouth (in modern Welsh Y Bermo, but originally Aber-mawdd, meaning "mouth of the [river] Mawdd(ach))".

Finally, there are a number of places, listed in the table below, where the English and Welsh names have, or may appear to have, different origins.  These have developed for a variety of reasons. Brecon and Cardigan both took their English names from their surrounding historic kingdoms, but took their Welsh names from local rivers; almost the reverse process occurred at Usk. Names given by Norse settlers, such as Swansea, Fishguard and Anglesey, tended to be adopted in English usage but not by the Welsh. Again, there are exceptions such as the island of Skomer (from Norse words meaning "cloven island"). English names for the Great Orme and Worm's Head both derive from the Norse word orm, referring to their shape resembling a serpent's head.

Places in Wales whose Welsh and English names appear substantially different

Official policy on place-names in Wales

The naming of places in Wales can be a matter of dispute and uncertainty. In some cases there is an issue of whether both the Welsh and English names should be used, or only one, and which should be given priority. In other cases it is because usage and style have changed over the years, and there is debate over which form or spelling of a placename should be used. Both the Welsh Government and the Ordnance Survey have policies on standardising place-names, drawing on advice from the Welsh Language Commissioner and the Place-name Research Centre at the University of Wales, Bangor.

The policy of the Welsh Government on place-names as shown on road signs within its jurisdiction is set out in its Welsh Language Scheme. This states: "The signs for which we are responsible (mostly motorway and trunk road signs) will be bilingual. Signs which are in English only at the moment will be made bilingual when they are replaced.... When both languages are included on one sign with one language above the other, the order in which the languages appear will follow the practice adopted by the local authority where the sign is located." The latter proviso applies because local authorities have discretion over the forms used on local highway signs. In the predominantly Welsh-speaking areas of Wales, the Welsh form of the name is usually given first; in other areas, the English name is usually given first.

The guidance also states: "Signs containing place names in England will contain the Welsh and English versions of the name....".  This proviso has led to new motorway signs in south Wales showing the names Llundain and Bryste as well as their English-language names, London and Bristol.

Welsh names for other places in Great Britain and Ireland

The modern Welsh language contains names for many towns and other geographical features across Britain and Ireland.  In some cases, these derive from the Brythonic names which were used during or before the Roman occupation: for example, Llundain (London), Cernyw (Cornwall), Dyfnaint (Devon), and Ebrauc/Efrog (York).  The origin of the modern Welsh name for England itself, Lloegr , is disputed, but one widely believed theory – which, however, has no etymological foundation – is that it derives from purportedly poetic words meaning "lost land", and was originally applied to areas of Mercia after the Saxon conquest before being applied to the whole of England.

Many English county towns, founded as Roman castra and now having the English suffix "-c(h)ester", also have Welsh names, in most cases using the prefix Caer-.  Examples include Caer or Caerlleon (for Chester), Caerloyw (Gloucester), Caerwrangon (Worcester), Caergrawnt (Cambridge, from Grantchester), and Caerwynt (Winchester).  In some other cases, Welsh names are translations of the English name, often influenced by the Welsh poetic tradition – for example, Rhydychen (literally, "oxen ford") for Oxford, and Gwlad-yr-haf ("land of summer") for Somerset. There are some erroneous "translations" such as Rhydwely for Bedford, which is actually derived from an English personal name Beda, and not the noun "bed" (Welsh (g)wely). Some English cities which have developed more recently, but with which Welsh people have had commercial links through trading or other economic associations such as through population migration, have developed Welsh forms of their English names.  Examples are Bryste (Bristol) and Lerpwl (Liverpool), although some claim that Liverpool has a possible Welsh derivation from "Y Llif", a name for the Atlantic Ocean and meaning "the flood" together with "pwll" which represents the word Pool in English place names and is generally accepted as of Brythonic origin.. However such a name is impossible in Welsh, and would certainly could not have given "Liverpool", whose origin is clearly Old English   

A final set of Welsh place-names are those for settlements in England which lie close to the modern border with Wales.  In some cases, such as Ross-on-Wye (Rhosan-ar-Wy) and probably Leominster (Llanllieni), the English name seems to have derived from the Welsh name.  In other cases, such as Llwydlo (Ludlow) and Henffordd (Hereford), the Welsh name derived from the English name of the settlement.  The Welsh name for Shrewsbury, Yr Amwythig, means "the fort in scrubland", which is one theory of the origin of the English name.  Oswestry ("Oswald's tree") is in Welsh Croesoswallt ("Oswald's cross") – although Old English treow in fact meant "cross" as well as "tree".

See also
Aber and Inver as place-name elements
Celtic onomastics
Celtic toponymy
Cumbrian toponymy
Irish toponymy
List of generic forms in place names in the United Kingdom and Ireland
Llan place name element
Scottish toponymy
Toponymy in Great Britain
Welsh Place-Name Society
Welsh place names in other countries
Welsh surnames

References

External links
 BBC Wales: What's in a name?
Welsh Language Commissioner: Place-names Advisory Service
Place-names Research Centre, University of Wales
Ordnance Survey Welsh Language Scheme
Ordnance Survey Guide to Welsh origins of place names in Britain
 Links to various English-Welsh dictionaries

Welsh
Geography of Wales
Place name element etymologies
Welsh culture
Welsh language